Danny Walker (born 29 June 1999) is an English professional rugby league footballer who plays as a  for the Warrington Wolves in the Super League and the England Knights at international level.

He played for the Widnes Vikings in the Super League, and has spent time on loan from Warrington at the Rochdale Hornets in the Championship.

Background
Walker was born in Warrington, Cheshire, England.
He was educated at Beamont Collegiate Academy, Warrington.

Career

Widnes Vikings
In 2017 he made his Super League début for the Widnes Vikings against the Leigh Centurions.

Warrington Wolves
After the conclusion of Season 2018 where the Vikings were relegated, he subsequently signed a three-year deal with his home town club Warrington Wolves starting from the 2019 season.

International career
In July 2018 he was selected in the England Knights Performance squad. Later that year he was selected for the England Knights on their tour of Papua New Guinea. He played against Papua New Guinea at the Oil Search National Football Stadium.

References

External links

Warrington Wolves profile
Widnes Vikings profile
SL profile
Danny Walker set to make first team debut
Warrington Born Walker Signs For Wire
Walker: "It means the world to me"

1999 births
Living people
England Knights national rugby league team captains
England Knights national rugby league team players
Rochdale Hornets players
Rugby league hookers
Rugby league players from Warrington
Warrington Wolves players
Widnes Vikings players